Eric Dwyer (15 June 1917 – 15 May 1997) was an Australian cricketer. He played one first-class match for Tasmania in 1937/38.

See also
 List of Tasmanian representative cricketers

References

External links
 

1917 births
1997 deaths
Australian cricketers
Tasmania cricketers
Cricketers from Tasmania